AppImage is a format for distributing portable software on Linux without needing superuser permissions to install the application. It tries also to allow Linux distribution-agnostic binary software deployment for application developers, also called upstream packaging. Released first in 2004 under the name klik, it was continuously developed, then renamed in 2011 to PortableLinuxApps and later in 2013 to AppImage.

Description

Objectives
AppImage aims to be an application deployment system for Linux with the following objectives: simplicity, binary compatibility, distro agnosticism, no installation, no root permission, being portable, and keeping the underlying operating system untouched.

Properties
AppImage does not install the application in the traditional Linux sense. Instead of putting the application's various files in the distro's appropriate places in the file system, the AppImage file is just the application's compressed image. When it runs, the file is mounted with FUSE. This behavior is consistent with AppImage's predecessors, klik and PortableLinuxApps.

It uses one file per application. Each file is self-contained: it includes all libraries the application depends on that are not already part of the targeted base-system. An AppImage of version 1.0 is an ISO 9660 Rock Ridge file (which can be optionally zisofs compressed) containing a minimal AppDir and a tiny runtime. (Version 2 may use other file system image formats like SquashFS). An AppImage application can be added to a live CD by adding only one file to the live CD.

AppImage files are simpler than installing an application. No extraction tools are needed, nor is it necessary to modify the operating system or user environment. Regular users on the common Linux distributions can download it, make it executable, and run it.

AppImage allows generation of embedded digital signature, which need to be verified with an external utility. The format does not offer form of self-check with package authenticity verification or runtime confinement by sandboxing.

History

klik

AppImage's predecessor klik was designed in 2004 by Simon Peter. The client-side software is GPL-licensed. klik integrated with web browsers on the user's computer. Users downloaded and installed software by typing a URL beginning with klik://. This downloaded a klik "recipe" file, which was used to generate a .cmg file. For main ingredients, usually pre-built .deb packages from Debian Stable repositories were fed into the recipe's .cmg generation process. In this way, one recipe could be used to supply packages to a wide variety of platforms. With klik, only eight programs could be run at once because of the limitation of mounting compressed images with the Linux kernel, unless FUSE was used. The file was remounted each time the program is run, meaning the user could remove the program by simply deleting the .cmg file. A next version, klik2, was in development; and would natively incorporate the FUSE kernel module, but it never reached past the beta stage. Around 2011, the klik project went dormant and the homepage went offline for some time.

PortableLinuxApps
Simon Peter started a successor project named PortableLinuxApps with similar goals around that time. The technology was adapted for instance by the "portablelinuxgames.org" repository, providing hundreds of mostly open-source video games.

AppImage
Around 2013, the software was renamed again from portableLinuxApps to AppImage; the license became the MIT license. AppImage is the format and AppImageKit is a concrete open source implementation. The development happens in a GitHub repository.

Reception and usage
Klik was in 2007 the inspiration for Alexander Larsson's glick project, the precursor of Flatpak, which was released in 2016.

Many open source software projects now distribute binaries as AppImages.

See also
 Portable application creators
 Autopackage
 Snap
 Flatpak
 Zero Install, another similar project
 ROX uses directories (AppDirs) as application bundles.
 List of Linux package management systems

References

External links
 
 AppImages for various applications by the AppImage developer
 Easily Run And Integrate AppImage Files With AppImageLauncher
 portablelinuxapps.org project page on SourceForge (accessed August 2, 2011)
 klik.atekon.de Official klik site (archived)
 klik client repository page at Google Code

Linux installation software
Linux package management-related software
Software distribution
Software using the MIT license